The men's 400 metres event  at the 1982 European Athletics Indoor Championships was held on 6 and 7 March.

Medalists

Results

Heats
The winner of each heat (Q) and the next 2 fastest (q) qualified for the final.

Final

References

400 metres at the European Athletics Indoor Championships
400